Kinoshita (written: 木下 or 木之下) is a Japanese surname. Notable people with the surname include:

 Airi Kinoshita (1998–2005), Japanese murder victim
 Akira Kinoshita (born 1936), Japanese photographer
 Alicia Kinoshita (born 1967), Japanese sailor
 Ayumi Kinoshita (born 1982), Japanese actress
 Hiroyuki Kinoshita (born 1958), Japanese voice actor and actor
 Iesada Kinoshita  (1543–1608), Japanese samurai
 Jun'an Kinoshita (1621–1699), Japanese Neo-Confucian philosopher
 Junji Kinoshita (1914–2006), Japanese playwright
 Keisuke Kinoshita (1912–1998), Japanese film director
, Japanese shogi player
 Kosuke Kinoshita (born 1994), Japanese footballer
, Japanese ice hockey player
 Kyosuke Kinoshita (born 1941) chairman of Acom, son of Masao
 Makiko Kinoshita (born 1956), Japanese composer
 Masaki Kinoshita (born 1989), Japanese footballer
 Masao Kinoshita (1910 – ?), founder of Acom, a major consumer loan company in Japan
 Mokutaro Kinoshita (1885–1945), pen-name of a Japanese author, Dramaturge, poet, art historian and literary critic
 Naoe Kinoshita (1869–1937), Japanese Christian socialist activist and author
 Naoyuki Kinoshita (born 1954), Japanese art historian
 Noriaki Kinoshita (born 1982), Japanese American football player
 Robert Kinoshita (1914–2014), American artist, art director and set and production designer
 Sakura Kinoshita, Japanese manga artist
 Sayaka Kinoshita, Japanese voice actress
 Toichiro Kinoshita (born 1925), Japanese theoretical physicist
 Yuka Kinoshita (born 1985), a Japanese professional eater

See also
 7250 Kinoshita, asteroid
 Kinoshita Station

Japanese-language surnames